Verinopolis or Berinopolis was a city and bishopric in ancient Galatia, central Anatolia (modern Turkey).

History 
The city is known only from its bishopric and as an administrative unit, from the 7th to the late 13th centuries. Its location is unknown, and its traditional identification (e.g. by William Mitchell Ramsay or Raymond Janin) with the late antique waystation of Aegonne or Euagina, localized near the modern settlement of Büyük Köhne (today Sorgun), is most probably incorrect.

The city is not known before the 7th century, but obviously existed earlier, since it was named or renamed from a previous, unknown name, in honour of Verina, wife of the Emperor Zeno. The city belonged to the Roman province of Galatia Prima, and later to the Bucellarian Theme, until Emperor Leo VI the Wise detached it (along with the neighbouring banda of Stavros or Stavropolis and Myriokephalon) to form the new tourma of Saniana in the theme of Charsianon.

In the Notitiae Episcopatuum of the Patriarchate of Constantinople, the bishopric of Verinopolis appears as a suffragan see of the Metropolis of Ancyra; in later lists, beginning with the Notitia 7, under Leo VI, it appears to have become a double bishopric together with Stavros/Stavropolis. Under Michael VIII Palaiologos it may have become an autocephalous archbishopric, or even a metropolis, but it vanished soon after.

Bishops
Stephen, attended the Third Council of Constantinople (680) and the Quinisext Council (692) 
Anthimus, attended the Second Council of Nicaea in 787 
Sisinnius, attended the councils of Constantinople in 869/870 and 879/880 
Andronicus, attested in a list under Patriarch Alexios Stoudites (1025–1043), unclear whether he was of Verinopolis in Galatia, or Verinopolis in Lycaonia (Psibela).

References

Sources
 
 
 

Populated places of the Byzantine Empire
Defunct dioceses of the Ecumenical Patriarchate of Constantinople
Byzantine Anatolia
Populated places in ancient Galatia
Former populated places in Turkey
Lost ancient cities and towns
Catholic titular sees in Asia